Sam Prekop (born October 18, 1964) is an American musician in the band The Sea and Cake.  He also has released five solo albums.

Early life
Prekop was born in London, but grew up in Chicago. He studied at the Kansas City Art Institute.

Career

Shrimp Boat
Back in Chicago, Prekop formed the band Shrimp Boat, which was active from 1988 to 1993.

The Sea and Cake
After Shrimp Boat dissolved in 1993, Sam Prekop and Eric Claridge formed The Sea and Cake, and recruited Archer Prewitt and John McEntire.

Solo career
Prekop enlisted the help of Jim O'Rourke (X-Factor) to produce his self-titled first solo album in 1999. Bassist Josh Abrams, drummer Chad Taylor, and guitarist Archer Prewitt also contributed their talents. The album was described as soft and breezy, with tinges of Brazilian pop. In April that year Prekop performed with Aerial M in Toronto.

In 2005, Who's Your New Professor featured drummer Chad Taylor and cornetist Rob Mazurek (both from the Chicago Underground Duo), bassist Josh Abrams (Sticks & Stones), and The Sea and Cake bandmates Archer Prewitt and John McEntire on guitar and drums, respectively.

Old Punch Card primarily featured modular synthesizer.

Released in 2015, The Republic further explored the emotional possibilities of the modular synthesizer. The first nine tracks (all named "The Republic") were assembled as part of an art installation by the artist David Hartt also called The Republic.

Personal life
His father is the photographer Martin Prekop. He has two brothers, the furniture designer Hank Prekop and the painter Zak Prekop. He has two children, Helen and Francis Prekop.

Discography
 1999: Sam Prekop (Thrill Jockey)
 2005: Who's Your New Professor (Thrill Jockey)
 2010: Old Punch Card (Thrill Jockey)
 2015: The Republic (Thrill Jockey)
 2020: Comma (Thrill Jockey)

References

External links
 https://samprekop.bandcamp.com/
 
 
 The Sea And Cake
 Sam Prekop's Artwork at Tiny Park

1964 births
 Living people
 American post-rock groups
 American male musicians
 Kansas City Art Institute alumni
 The Sea and Cake members